Holešov Airport was an old airport serving the city of Holešov. The airport opened in the 1946 and closed in 2009.

References

Airports established in 1946
Airports in the Czech Republic
Airports disestablished in 2009
Defunct airports